The amazon, also known as the queen+knight compound also known as the dragon, is a fairy chess piece that can move like a queen or a knight. It may thus be considered the sum of all orthodox chess pieces other than the king and the pawn. The amazon can force checkmate on an enemy king without the help of any other friendly piece.

Chess moves in this article use A as notation for the amazon.

Movement

The amazon's movement combines those of the queen and the knight. Thus, it may move to any square on the same rank, file, or diagonal as long as it does not jump, or it may move to any of the nearest squares not on the same rank, file, or diagonal.

History
The amazon is one of the most simply described fairy chess pieces and as such has a long history and has gone by many names. It was first used in Turkish Great Chess, a large medieval variant of chess, where it was called the giraffe. Later, it was widely experimented with in the Middle Ages to replace the slow ferz, and it competed with the modern queen for this role; the modern queen eventually won out, as the amazon's power was deemed excessive. In Russia, the amazon persisted into the 18th century; some players disapproved of this ability to "gallop like the horse" (knight). The book A History of Chess by  H. J. R. Murray, page 384, says that some Mr. Coxe, who was in Russia in 1772, saw chess being played with the amazon.

The amazon is most well-known for its appearance in the chess variant Maharajah and the Sepoys, where it is the maharajah. It is royal and White's only piece.

Value

The amazon's value is estimated to be 12 or 13 points in the chess piece relative value system, as the amazon is extremely mobile, can control every square surrounding itself in a 5×5 area, and can force checkmate by itself. In contrast, although the gryphon (or griffin) from Grande Acedrex (which moves one step diagonally before continuing outwards as a rook) would seem to have the value of two rooks (10–11 points), the squares it attacks are more dispersed, and it is more easily defended against than the amazon.

In the endgame of king and amazon versus king and empress (rook+knight compound), the amazon usually wins; however, in a few positions, the weaker side may force a draw by setting up a fortress. Such a fortress forces the side with the amazon to give perpetual check; otherwise, the side with the empress can force a simplification or give its own perpetual check. King and amazon versus king is a forced win for the side with the amazon; checkmate can be forced within four moves. In comparison, the queen requires 10 moves and the rook requires 16. In fact, the amazon does not even require its king's help to force checkmate (as an example of a checkmate position, the king is in the corner and the attacking amazon is a knight's move away from it), and this great power is the reason why it is not seen as often in chess variants as the princess or empress.

Symbol

Both white and black symbols for the amazon were added to version 12 of the Unicode standard in March 2019, in the Chess Symbols block:

🩎 U+1FA4E WHITE CHESS KNIGHT-QUEEN
🩑 U+1FA51 BLACK CHESS KNIGHT-QUEEN

See also
 Empress—the rook+knight compound
 Princess—the bishop+knight compound
 Queen—the rook+bishop compound

Notes

References

Bibliography
 Piececlopedia: Amazon by Hans Bodlaender and Fergus Duniho, The Chess Variant Pages
 Endgame statistics with fantasy pieces by Dave McCooey, The Chess Variant Pages
 Amazon Chess by Hans Bodlaender, The Chess Variant Pages
 Factors that Contribute to Piece Values by Ralph Betza, The Chess Variant Pages

Fairy chess pieces